The 2022–23 North Carolina Tar Heels women's basketball team represents the University of North Carolina at Chapel Hill in the ongoing 2022–23 NCAA Division I women's basketball season. The Tar Heels are led by head coach Courtney Banghart, who is in her fourth season as the Tar Heel head coach. She is assisted by Joanne Aluka-White, Adrian Walters, and Itoro Coleman. The Tar Heels play their home games at Carmichael Arena, and are members of the Atlantic Coast Conference.

Previous season
The Tar Heels finished the 2021–22 NCAA Division I women's basketball season with a record of 25–7. They went 13–5 in ACC play, finishing in a three-way tie for third place in the conference. Due to tiebreakers, they earned the 4th seed and a double bye in the ACC tournament. They were defeated by Virginia Tech in the quarterfinals. The Tar Heels earned the 5th seed in the Greensboro region of the NCAA tournament, making it to the Sweet Sixteen before losing to the region's number one seed, South Carolina.

Off-Season

Departures

Additions

Recruiting Class
Source:

Roster

Schedule
Source

|-
!colspan=6 style="background:#56A0D3; color:#FFFFFF;"| Non-Conference Regular Season

|-
!colspan=6 style="background:#56A0D3; color:#FFFFFF;"| ACC Regular Season

|-
!colspan=6 style="background:#56A0D3; color:#FFFFFF;"| ACC Tournament

|-
!colspan=6 style="background:#56A0D3; color:#FFFFFF;"| NCAA Tournament

Rankings

See also
 2022–23 North Carolina Tar Heels men's basketball team

References

North Carolina
North Carolina Tar Heels women's basketball seasons
North Carolina Tar Heels women's basketball team
North Carolina Tar Heels women's basketball team
North Carolina